Anders Jacobsen (born 18 April 1968) is a former Norwegian footballer.

Career
Jacobsen was born in Oslo and played his club football in Norway with Asker, Vålerenga, Lillestrøm, Skeid and Start before joining English club Sheffield United in December 1998. He played 12 times for the Blades from 1998–99 and joined Stoke City at the end of the campaign. At Stoke, Jacobsen played 44 times from 1999–2000, helping Stoke to reach the play-offs where they lost out to Gillingham. He then joined Notts County playing 34 matches from 2000–01 before returning to Norway with Asker and Skeid.

Since retiring he has moved into management, and was in charge of Norwegian Second Division team Skeid and Strømsgodset IF.

Career statistics
Source:

A.  The "Other" column constitutes appearances and goals in the Football League play-offs, and Football League Trophy.

References

External links

1968 births
Living people
Footballers from Oslo
Norwegian footballers
Norwegian football managers
Asker Fotball players
Vålerenga Fotball players
Lillestrøm SK players
IK Start players
Sheffield United F.C. players
Stoke City F.C. players
Notts County F.C. players
Skeid Fotball players
Expatriate footballers in England
Norwegian expatriate footballers
Strømsgodset Toppfotball managers
English Football League players
Skeid Fotball managers
Association football defenders